Héctor Bustamante (born 7 September 1949 in Mexico City) is a Mexican former field hockey player who competed in the 1968 Summer Olympics.

References

External links
 

1949 births
Living people
Sportspeople from Mexico City
Mexican male field hockey players
Olympic field hockey players of Mexico
Field hockey players at the 1968 Summer Olympics
Pan American Games medalists in field hockey
Pan American Games silver medalists for Mexico
Pan American Games bronze medalists for Mexico
Field hockey players at the 1971 Pan American Games
Field hockey players at the 1975 Pan American Games
Field hockey players at the 1979 Pan American Games
Medalists at the 1971 Pan American Games
Medalists at the 1975 Pan American Games